Trachylepis hemmingi, also known commonly as the Somali mabuya, is a species of skink, a lizard in the family Scincidae. The species is endemic to Somalia.

Etymology
The specific name, hemmingi, is in honor of English entomologist Christopher Francis Hemming, who collected the holotype.

Reproduction
The mode of reproduction of T. hemmingi is unknown.

References

Further reading
 (2003). "On the identity of Lacerta punctata Linnaeus 1758, the type species of the genus Euprepis Wagler 1830, and the generic assignment of Afro-Malagasy skinks". African Journal of Herpetology 52 (1): 1–7. (Trachylepis hemmingi, new combination).
Lanza B (1990). "Amphibians and reptiles of the Somali Democratic Republic: check list and biogeography". Biogeographia 14: 407–465.

Trachylepis
Skinks of Africa
Reptiles of Somalia
Endemic fauna of Somalia
Reptiles described in 1965
Taxa named by Carl Gans
Taxa named by Raymond Laurent
Taxa named by Hemchandra Pandit